Konská is a village and municipality in Žilina District in the Žilina Region of northern Slovakia.

History 
In historical records the village was first mentioned in 1228, when a church was built. Since 1350, the village is independent.

Geography 
The municipality lies at an altitude of 435 metres and covers an area of 5.311 km². It has a population of about 1,408 people. The actual major is Janka Stupňanová. The municipality council has 7 members.

See also
 List of municipalities and towns in Slovakia

References

Genealogical resources

The records for genealogical research are available at the state archive "Statny Archiv in Bytca, Slovakia"

 Roman Catholic church records (births/marriages/deaths): 1750-1910 (parish A)

External links 
 https://web.archive.org/web/20070513023228/http://www.statistics.sk/mosmis/eng/run.html
Surnames of living people in Konska

Villages and municipalities in Žilina District